Kysak railway station serves the village and municipality of Kysak, in the Košice Region, eastern Slovakia. Opened in 1870, the station is an important railway junction, where the Košice–Plaveč–Čirč–Muszyna railway diverges towards Poland from the Košice–Žilina railway, which is part of Slovakia's main east–west rail corridor.

The station is currently owned by Železnice Slovenskej republiky (ŽSR); train services are operated by Železničná spoločnosť Slovensko (ZSSK).

Location
Kysak railway station is situated at the eastern edge of the village.

History
The station was opened on 1 September 1870, upon the inauguration of the Košice–Prešov section of the Košice–Plaveč–Čirč–Muszyna railway.

It became a junction station soon afterwards, on 12 March 1872, when the section of the Košice–Bohumín Railway between Spišská Nová Ves and Kysak was completed.

Facilities
The two storey station building houses information and ticketing facilities.

The station yard has six tracks equipped with platforms for passenger services and four tracks for freight workings.

Train services
Kysak railway station is the junction of the following Slovakian railway lines:

180 Košice–Žilina (part of the Košice–Bohumín Railway)
188 Košice–Plaveč–Čirč–Muszyna (PKP)

Line 180 forms part of Pan-European Corridor Va, which runs from Venice in Italy to Kyiv in Ukraine, via Bratislava, Žilina, Košice and Uzhhorod.

Passenger train traffic is made up of local trains and long-distance services to and from Poland, the Czech Republic and Hungary.

Interchange
The station offers interchange with local buses.

Services

See also

History of rail transport in Slovakia
Rail transport in Slovakia

References

External links

 Kysak railway station on vlaky.net 

Railway stations in Košice Region
Railway stations opened in 1870
Railway stations in Slovakia opened in the 19th century